William John Harty (14 January 1899 Waterford, Ireland – 29 May 1959 Los Angeles, California) was an Irish born dance band drummer.

Career
Born in Waterford in Ireland in 1899, Harty moved to Birmingham in England after World War I and took up the drums while working for the Dunlop Tyre Company. He played with various local bands on the early Birmingham jazz scene before deputising with an American band at the Birmingham Palais. He toured around Europe for much of the 1920s before returning to England to play with bands led by Harry Shalson, Al Starita, Jean Pougnet, Bill Gerhardi, Percival Mackey, Arthur Lally and Lew Stone. He was Ray Noble's preferred drummer for the studio recordings he made with The New Mayfair Dance Orchestra between 1929–1934 In 1934, Harty also became Noble's manager, sailing to the United States with him and vocalist Al Bowlly later that year, to organise a touring band there. He remained Noble's manager and drummer into the 1950s.

Bibliography

Notes

References

1899 births
1959 deaths
British jazz drummers
People from Waterford (city)